Jay Hill may refer to

 Jay Hill (born 1952), Canadian politician
 Jay Hill (racing driver) (born 1964), American racing driver
 Jay Hill (American football) (born 1975), American football coach

See also
 Hill (surname)
 Hill (disambiguation)